Covasna is a town in Covasna County, Transylvania, Romania, at an altitude of . It is known for its natural mineral waters and mofettas.

The town administers one village, Chiuruș. The village has a population of 451 and has an absolute Székely Hungarian majority.

Before Orbaiszék merged with Sepsiszék and Kézdiszék to create Háromszék County, in 1876, Covasna was the capital village of Orbaiszék.

Name origin
There are several theories regarding the origin of the city's name, the most recognized one being that it originates from the Slavic kvas, which means "bitter", referring to the taste of the mineral water springs located in the city.

According to Szabó Gyula (1914–1984), some legends suggest that the name of Kovászna might have been the result of a fusion between the name of "Kó" and the word "vászon" (it means canvas in Hungarian), thus meaning "Kó's canvas". Theories suggest that the individual of "Kó" might have been a knight, a craftsman or even the last monarch of the Fairies Fortress.

Demographics
According to the 2011 census, Covasna has 10,265 inhabitants, of which 7,549 or 66.4% are Hungarians and 3,672 or 32.3% are Romanians.

Demographic movement according to the censuses:

History
 1548 – First mentioned as Kowazna.
 1567 – Mentioned in a document, as a prestigious locality, having 61 registered homes.
 1756 – Gets destroyed by conflagration.
 1840 – Gets the right to hold its own market.
 1880 – Covasna has flourished as a health resort since the 1880s.
 1837, 1856, 1885 – The  ( in Romanian: Balta Dracului; in English: Devil's Lake)  mud volcano erupts.
 1889–91 – the Covasna–Comandău narrow-gauge railway is built
 1952 – Covasna became a town.
 1970's – Several hotels and cure centers were built in Covasna.
 1996 – Forest fire in the Fairie's Valley.
 2000's – Covasna is a nationally important spa town in Romania, having an important cardiovascular hospital.

International relations

Twin towns – Sister cities
Covasna is twinned with:
 Pápa, Hungary
 Nagykanizsa, Hungary
 Gyula, Hungary
 Balatonfüred, Hungary
 Csenger, Hungary
 Călărași, Moldova

Natives
The Hungarian explorer and linguist Sándor Kőrösi Csoma was born in Chiuruș/Csomakőrös in 1784. Kőrösi is widely seen as the founder of Tibetology, he was the compiler and author of the first Tibetan-English dictionary and grammar book. He died in Darjeeling, India in 1842.

A statue in his honour was erected in the centre of the village in 1972 and there is an exhibition in the cultural centre.

References

External links 

 Official website in Romanian
 Official website in Hungarian
 
 

 
Towns in Romania
Populated places in Covasna County
Localities in Transylvania
Spa towns in Romania
Place names of Slavic origin in Romania